Raphael Meir ben Yehuda Panigel (1804–1893) was the Sephardi Chief Rabbi of Jerusalem, Ottoman Empire.

Panigel was born in Pazardzhik, Bulgaria, but his family emigrated to the Land of Israel when he was a child. In 1828 and in 1863, he was an emissary on behalf of Jerusalem to the countries of North Africa, remaining there on both occasions for several years. In 1845 he travelled to Italy as an emissary of Hebron and was received with great respect at the Vatican by Pope Gregory XVI. In 1880 he became rishon le-Zion, and in 1890 the Ottoman authorities appointed him hacham bashi (head of the Jewish community of Palestine). He was held in great esteem by all communities and authorities. He authored Lev Marpe (1887), Talmudic novellae, responsa, and homilies. His son-in-law, Yaakov Shaul Elyashar, later succeeded him.

References

19th-century rabbis in Jerusalem
Rishon LeZion (rabbi)
Sephardi rabbis in Ottoman Palestine

People from Pazardzhik
1804 births

1893 deaths